The 1947 football season was São Paulo's 18th season since the club's founding in 1930.

Overall

{|class="wikitable"
|-
|Games played || 40 (20 Campeonato Paulista, 20 Friendly match)
|-
|Games won || 16 (8 Campeonato Paulista, 8 Friendly match)
|-
|Games drawn || 13 (9 Campeonato Paulista, 4 Friendly match)
|-
|Games lost || 11  (3 Campeonato Paulista, 8 Friendly match)
|-
|Goals scored || 92
|-
|Goals conceded || 73
|-
|Goal difference || +19
|-
|Best result || 8–2 (H) v Jabaquara – Campeonato Paulista – 1947.11.09
|-
|Worst result || 2–7 (A) v Bahia – Friendly match – 1947.10.26
|-
|Most appearances || 
|-
|Top scorer || 
|-

Friendlies

Official competitions

Campeonato Paulista

Record

External links
official website 

Association football clubs 1947 season
1947
1947 in Brazilian football